Scotsgap was a stone-built railway station in Northumberland on the Wansbeck Railway, which served the villages of Scots' Gap and Cambo. It was located on the line between Morpeth and Reedsmouth, and was the junction for the branch line of the Northumberland Railway to Rothbury.

History

Due to financial difficulties the line was built in stages. At this time the Wansbeck Railway Company amalgamated with the North British Railway. It was only on 1 May 1865 that the line was completed. In 1923 the line and the North British Railway merged with the London and North Eastern Railway.

The station was opened as Scots Gap in 1862, but was renamed Scotsgap in October 1903. In September 1952 passenger services were withdrawn from the line, and the goods service from much of the line in November 1963. The line was closed completely in October 1966 with the station being closed on 3 October 1966. The station building and platform remain and the site is now occupied by an agricultural merchant.

References

External links
Scotsgap Station on Northumbrian Railways
ScotsGap Station on Disused Stations
Scotsgap Station on a navigable 1956 O. S. map

Disused railway stations in Northumberland
Former North British Railway stations
Railway stations in Great Britain opened in 1862
Railway stations in Great Britain closed in 1952
1862 establishments in England